Chestnut Creek Wetlands Natural Area Preserve is a  Natural Area Preserve located in Floyd County, Virginia. Local wetlands support several rare species, while the upland slopes support northern hardwoods including beech, birch, and maple. The area has a long farming and grazing history, but the wetlands have survived, dominated by sedges and grasses with few trees and shrubs.  The property was acquired using a voter-approved state government bond and a recovery grant from the United States Fish and Wildlife Service.

The preserve is owned and maintained by the Virginia Department of Conservation and Recreation, and it hosts an agricultural lease . It does not include improvements for public access, and visitors must make arrangements with a state-employed land steward prior to visiting.

See also
 List of Virginia Natural Area Preserves

References

External links
 Virginia Department of Conservation and Recreation: Chestnut Creek Wetlands Natural Area Preserve

Virginia Natural Area Preserves
Protected areas of Floyd County, Virginia
Landforms of Floyd County, Virginia
Wetlands of Virginia